The 2012 Fresno mayoral election was held on June 5, 2012  to elect the mayor of Fresno, California. It saw the reelection of Ashley Swearengin.

Since Swearengin won a majority in the first round, no runoff was required.

Municipal elections in California are officially non-partisan.

Results

References 

2012 California elections
2012 United States mayoral elections
2012 mayoral election
June 2012 events in the United States 
2012